The Seven Sisters are a group of seven highly selective liberal arts colleges in the Northeastern United States that are historically women's colleges: Barnard College, Bryn Mawr College, Mount Holyoke College, Smith College, and Wellesley College are still women's colleges. Vassar College is currently a coeducational college and Radcliffe College was absorbed in 1999 by Harvard College.

These colleges were created to provide women with the educational equivalent to the (traditionally male) Ivy League colleges. 

The name Seven Sisters is a reference to the Greek myth of The Pleiades, the seven daughters of the Titan Atlas and the sea-nymph Pleione: Maia, Electra, Taygete, Alcyone, Celaeno, Sterope, and Merope.

Locations

Four of the colleges are in Massachusetts, two are in New York, and one is in Pennsylvania.

In Massachusetts, Mount Holyoke College and Smith College are part of the Five College Consortium with Amherst College, Hampshire College, and University of Massachusetts Amherst. Wellesley College has cross-registration and dual-degree programs with Massachusetts Institute of Technology, Olin College, and cross-registration with Brandeis University and Babson College. Wellesley College has an exchange program with Spelman College. Radcliffe College shared a common and overlapping history with Harvard College from the time it was founded as "the Harvard Annex" in 1879. Harvard and Radcliffe integrated sexes in 1977, but Radcliffe continued to be the sponsoring college for women at Harvard until the entities officially merged in 1999.

In New York, Vassar College is historically affiliated with Yale University, which at one point suggested a merger; Vassar ultimately became co-educational in 1969 and remains independent. Barnard College was Columbia University's women's liberal arts undergraduate college until its all-male coordinate school Columbia College went co-ed in 1983; Barnard continues to be a women's undergraduate college affiliated with (but still legally separate from) Columbia, and students receive a diploma signed by the presidents of both schools.

In Pennsylvania, Bryn Mawr College, along with Haverford College and Swarthmore College, make up the Tri-College Consortium, which belongs to the Quaker Consortium along with nearby University of Pennsylvania. Bryn Mawr students may attend classes at Haverford, Swarthmore, and Penn, and vice versa. A merger between Bryn Mawr and Haverford College was considered at one point.

Background

Timeline

History
Irene Harwarth, Mindi Maline, and Elizabeth DeBra note that "independent nonprofit women's colleges, which included the 'Seven Sisters', were founded to provide educational opportunities to women equal to those available to men and were geared toward women who wanted to study the liberal arts".
The colleges also offered broader opportunities in academia to women, hiring many female faculty members and administrators.

Early proponents of education for women were Sarah Pierce (Litchfield Female Academy, 1792); Catharine Beecher (Hartford Female Seminary, 1823); Zilpah P. Grant Banister (Ipswich Female Seminary, 1828); and Mary Lyon. Lyon was involved in the development of both Hartford Female Seminary and Ipswich Female Seminary. She was also involved in the creation of Wheaton Female Seminary (now Wheaton College, Massachusetts)  in 1834. In 1837, Lyon founded Mount Holyoke Female Seminary (Mount Holyoke College).  Mount Holyoke received its collegiate charter in 1888 and became Mount Holyoke Seminary and College. It became Mount Holyoke College in 1893. Vassar, however, was the first of the Seven Sisters to be chartered as a college in 1861.

Wellesley College was chartered in 1870 as the Wellesley Female Seminary, and was renamed Wellesley College in 1873. It opened to students in 1875. Smith College was chartered in 1871 and opened its doors in 1875. Bryn Mawr opened in 1885.

Radcliffe College grew out of the Women's Education Association of Boston, founded by a group of influential women, including Elizabeth Cary Agassiz, whose late husband was a famous Harvard scientist.  Radcliffe College was founded in 1879 and chartered by the Commonwealth of Massachusetts in 1894. It was informally called The Harvard Annex because Harvard professors repeated the lectures they had given to male Harvard students there until 1943. By 1946, the majority of Harvard College courses were offered to both female Radcliffe students and male Harvard students. The schools further integrated in the 1960s, and in 1963 the first Harvard degrees were conferred on Radcliffe women. Despite having joint admissions, women's degrees would continue to bear both Harvard and Radcliffe seals until 1999, when the merger of the two schools was completed. Since 1999, all undergraduate students have received diplomas bearing the seal of Harvard College, and been identified as Harvard students. Radcliffe College no longer exists as an undergraduate institution, but Radcliffe class reunions take place at Harvard each year. The Radcliffe Institute for Advanced Study was created following the merger in 1999, and today offers non-degree instruction and executive education programs.

The Barnard Bulletin in 1976 described the relationship between Barnard College and Columbia University as "intricate and ambiguous". Barnard president Debora Spar said in 2012 that "the relationship is admittedly a complicated one, a unique one and one that may take a few sentences to explain to the outside community". Outside sources often describe Barnard as part of Columbia; The New York Times in 2013, for example, called Barnard "an undergraduate women's college of Columbia University". Its front gates state "Barnard College of Columbia University". Barnard describes itself as "both an independently incorporated educational institution and an official college of Columbia University" that is "one of the University's four colleges, but we're largely autonomous, with our own leadership and purse strings", and advises students to state "Barnard College, Columbia University" or "Barnard College of Columbia University" on résumés. Facebook includes Barnard students and alumnae within the Columbia interest group. Columbia describes Barnard as an affiliated institution that is a faculty of the university or is "in partnership with" it. Both the college and Columbia evaluate Barnard faculty for tenure, and Barnard graduates receive Columbia diploma; signed by both the Barnard and the Columbia presidents.

Coeducation
Radcliffe College and Vassar College are no longer women's colleges. Radcliffe merged completely into Harvard College in 1999, and no longer exists as a separate undergraduate institution. The component parts of its campus, the Radcliffe Quadrangle and Radcliffe Yard, retain the designation "Radcliffe" in perpetuity, and serve or house both male and female students to this day. Vassar declined an offer to merge with Yale University and became independently coeducational in 1969.

Barnard College was founded in 1889 as a women's college affiliated with Columbia University.  However, it is independently governed, while making available to its students the instruction and the facilities of Columbia University. Columbia College, the university's largest liberal-arts undergraduate school, began admitting women in 1983 after a decade of failed negotiations with Barnard for a merger along the lines of the one between Harvard College and Radcliffe and between Brown and Pembroke. Barnard has an independent faculty (subject to Columbia University tenure approval) and board of trustees. Columbia University issues its diplomas, however, and most of Barnard's classes and activities are open to all members of Columbia University, male or female, and vice versa, in a reciprocal arrangement dating from 1900.

In 1969 Bryn Mawr and Haverford College (then all-male) developed a system of sharing residential colleges. When Haverford became coeducational in 1980, Bryn Mawr discussed the possibility of coeducation as well but decided against it.

As with Bryn Mawr, Mount Holyoke College, Smith College, and Wellesley College decided against adopting coeducation. Mount Holyoke engaged in a lengthy debate under the presidency of David Truman over the issue of coeducation. On November 6, 1971, "after reviewing an exhaustive study on coeducation, the board of trustees decided unanimously that Mount Holyoke should remain a women's college, and a group of faculty was charged with recommending curricular changes that would support the decision." Smith also made a similar decision in 1971. Two years later, Wellesley also announced that it would not adopt coeducation.

Transgender issues

Since the late 2000s, there has been discussion and controversy over how to accommodate transgender inclusion at the remaining women's colleges. This has risen to attention due to students that have in the course of their times at the colleges transitioned from women to other genders, and trans women applicants. Mount Holyoke became the first Seven Sisters college to accept transgender women in 2014. Barnard, Bryn Mawr, Smith, and Wellesley College announced trans-inclusive admissions policies in 2015.

Gallery

See also
List of current and historical women's universities and colleges in the United States
Timeline of women's colleges in the United States

References

+
+|.
 
Colloquial terms for groups of universities and colleges